Vasily Ivanovich Lebedev-Kumach;  — 20 February 1949) was a Soviet poet and lyricist.

Biography 
Vasily was born August 5, 1898 to a shoe maker. He went on to work in the printing department of the Revolutionary Military Council, moving on to ROSTO. He attended Moscow State University. He adopted the nickname Kumach, a Turkish name for a variety of red cloth used to symbolize revolution. In time the nickname was added to his surname.

Vasily's satirical verses published in such papers as Rabochaia gazeta, Krest’ianskaia gazeta, Gudok, and Krokodil led to his growing popularity. He also wrote songs for the film Late for a Date (1936).

Vasily wrote numerous songs, the most famous being probably Священная война (Svyaschennaya Voyna, 'The Sacred War'), Песня о Родине (A Song About the Motherland), Гимн партии большевиков (Hymn of the Bolshevik Party) and Как много девушек хороших (Such a lot of nice girls!), later immortalized as the Argentine Tango song Serdtse (Сердце-Heart) by Pyotr Leshchenko. He worked closely with the composer Isaak Dunayevsky. Composer Lyubov Streicher used Lebediv-Kumach‘s text for her song “A Simple Soviet Man,” which was recorded commercially by pianist Maria Yudina in 1937. He was also one of the first persons to use the term blat (блат) in print, when Krokodil published the poem Blat-not.

External Links

References

1898 births
1949 deaths
Burials at Novodevichy Cemetery
Musicians from Moscow
People from Moskovsky Uyezd
Communist Party of the Soviet Union members
Members of the Supreme Soviet of the Russian Soviet Federative Socialist Republic
Soviet poets
Russian male poets
Soviet male writers
20th-century Russian male writers
Soviet songwriters
Russian lyricists
20th-century Russian poets
Soviet military personnel of the Winter War
Soviet military personnel of World War II
Stalin Prize winners
Recipients of the Order of the Red Banner of Labour
Recipients of the Order of the Red Star